Antonio Valdés y Fernández Bazán (25 March 1744 – 4 April 1816) was an officer of the Spanish Royal Navy.

Biography 
He entered the navy at the age of 13. He distinguished himself in the defence of Morro Castle and San Salvador de la Punta Fortress during the Battle of Havana (1762). He also fought against the Barbary Coast pirates in 1767.

In 1781, he became director of the Royal Artillery Factory of La Cavada, and reorganised it to that extent that he was promoted to become inspector general of the Spanish Navy. In 1783, at the age of 38, he became Navy Minister and continued the modernisation of the Spanish Navy.

In 1785, among 12 flags that he drew, one was chosen to become the Spanish naval ensign flag by Charles III.

He became a knight in the Order of the Golden Fleece in 1797.

The settlements of Valdez, Alaska and Valdez, Florida were named after him, as well as Bazan Bay in Victoria, British Columbia, Canada. The oil tanker Exxon Valdez, that gained notoriety after running aground in Prince William Sound spilling its cargo of crude oil into the sea on March 24, 1989, was named after the Alaskan town which had been named after Valdés.

References

1744 births
1816 deaths
Captain generals of the Navy
People from Burgos
Flag designers
Knights of the Golden Fleece of Spain